Isla Las Animas, is an island in the Gulf of California east of the Baja California Peninsula. The island is uninhabited and is part of the La Paz Municipality.

Biology
Isla Las Animas has two species of reptiles: Phyllodactylus unctus (San Lucan leaf-toed gecko) and Urosaurus nigricauda (black-tailed brush lizard).

References

Further reading

Islands of the Gulf of California
Islands of Baja California Sur
Uninhabited islands of Mexico